Neuenhaus is a town in the district of Grafschaft Bentheim in Lower Saxony, Germany.

Neuenhaus may also refer to:

Neuenhaus (Samtgemeinde), the collective municipality centred on Neuenhaus, Germany
 Neuenhaus district, Aichtal, Baden-Württemberg, Germany

See also
Neuenhäusen, a suburb of Celle in Lower Saxony, Germany
Neunhausen, Wiltz, Diekirch, Luxembourg